Luiz Henrique Araújo Silva (born 18 March 1999), known as Luiz Henrique, is a Brazilian professional footballer who plays as a midfielder for Botafogo SP, emprestado pelo Fortaleza Esporte Clube

Professional career

Flamengo
Luiz Henrique made his professional debut with Flamengo in a 0-0 Campeonato Carioca tie with Macaé on 18 January 2020.

Fortaleza
On 21 February 2020, Luiz Henrique transferred to Fortaleza on a 2-year contract.

Career statistics

Honours
Fortaleza
Campeonato Cearense: 2021

Botafogo
Campeonato Brasileiro Série B: 2021

References

External links
 

1999 births
Living people
Footballers from Rio de Janeiro (city)
Brazilian footballers
Association football midfielders
Campeonato Brasileiro Série A players
Campeonato Brasileiro Série B players
CR Flamengo footballers
Fortaleza Esporte Clube players
Botafogo de Futebol e Regatas players
CR Vasco da Gama players